= Compensatory picks =

Compensatory picks may refer to:

- MLB Draft Compensatory Picks, picks awarded to Major League Baseball teams
- NFL Draft Compensatory Picks, picks awarded to National Football League teams
- NHL compensatory draft selection, picks awarded to National Hockey League teams
